USS Cleveland may refer to:

 , a protected cruiser commissioned in 1903 and scrapped in 1930
 , a light cruiser commissioned in 1942 and active in World War II
 ,  amphibious transport dock commissioned in 1967 and decommissioned in 2011
 , a new littoral combat ship, the building of which was announced on 8 October 2018.

See also
 



United States Navy ship names